The  is a floating moveable bridge in Konohana District, Osaka, Japan. It spans the North Waterway connecting the man-made islands Yumeshima and Maishima of Osaka Port.

It comprises a floating bridge over the waterway, transitional girder bridges on both ends of the floating bridge, and approach bridges on Yumeshima and Maishima. The bridge is supported on two large steel pontoons. Ordinarily, the bridge allows a navigation passage width of 135m. In the event that the main waterway is out of service, the bridge is swung by tugboats to widen the passage width to 200m or more, enabling the passage of larger vessels.

See also

 List of longest arch bridge spans
 Moveable bridge

References

Konohana-ku, Osaka
Bridges in Osaka Prefecture
Bridges completed in 2001
2001 establishments in Japan